Gernika Rugby Taldea is a Basque rugby team based in Gernika, Bizkaia which play in the Spanish League. The team was set up by some rugby supporters of the unfortunately bombed village, and is enjoying a steady rise in popularity in the region.

For the 2012–13 season, Gernika took part in the European Challenge Cup. Despite finishing fifth in the División de Honor in 2011–12 and losing in the playoff semifinals, Gernika were tapped for the Challenge Cup when the sides finishing ahead of them bowed out due to financial constraints.

Honours
División de Honor B: 3
 Champions: 1983–84, 1989–90, 2008–09
Copa del Rey: 0
 Runners-up: 1991

2012–13

Challenge Cup
Gernika RT played in pool 2 of the 2012–13 European Challenge Cup.

Final table

Per the Competition Rules, Perpignan and Worcester were level on the first tiebreaker of head-to-head competition points (5–5); Perpignan topped the pool on the second tiebreaker of head-to-head try count (3–1).

Matches

Squad 2014-2015 season

Season by season

11 seasons in División de Honor

References

External links
Official website

Rugby union teams in the Basque Country (autonomous community)
Rugby clubs established in 1973
1973 establishments in Spain
Sport in Biscay
Guernica